One Tree Point is a settlement on the southern side of Whangārei Harbour in Northland, New Zealand. The settlement includes the Marsden Point Marina.

History
One Tree Point was called "Single Tree Point" by Captain Lort Stokes of the Acheron in 1849.

Demographics
Statistics New Zealand describes One Tree Point as a small urban area. One Tree Point is part of the larger Marsden Point statistical area

One Tree Point had a population of 2,037 at the 2018 New Zealand census, an increase of 630 people (44.8%) since the 2013 census, and an increase of 1,125 people (123.4%) since the 2006 census. There were 765 households, comprising 990 males and 1,053 females, giving a sex ratio of 0.94 males per female, with 405 people (19.9%) aged under 15 years, 216 (10.6%) aged 15 to 29, 894 (43.9%) aged 30 to 64, and 531 (26.1%) aged 65 or older.

Ethnicities were 86.2% European/Pākehā, 19.4% Māori, 3.1% Pacific peoples, 4.1% Asian, and 1.8% other ethnicities. People may identify with more than one ethnicity.

Although some people chose not to answer the census's question about religious affiliation, 52.6% had no religion, 37.0% were Christian, 0.6% were Hindu, 0.1% were Muslim, 0.4% were Buddhist and 2.7% had other religions.

Of those at least 15 years old, 270 (16.5%) people had a bachelor's or higher degree, and 336 (20.6%) people had no formal qualifications. 360 people (22.1%) earned over $70,000 compared to 17.2% nationally. The employment status of those at least 15 was that 717 (43.9%) people were employed full-time, 216 (13.2%) were part-time, and 36 (2.2%) were unemployed.

Education
One Tree Point School is a coeducational contributing primary (years 1-6) school with a roll of   students as of  The school was established in 1972.

Notes

Whangarei District
Populated places in the Northland Region